Heuqueville may refer to the following places in France:

 Heuqueville, Eure, a commune in the Eure department
 Heuqueville, Seine-Maritime, a commune in the Seine-Maritime department